The 2010–11 season is Persibo Bojonegoro's 1st season that the club play in the Indonesia Super League, the top division of Indonesian football, and subsequently defect to Liga Primer Indonesia, an independent professional competition for football clubs in Indonesia.

Review and events
Bojonegoro is 2009-10 Premier Division champions, under supervision of the Football Association of Indonesia (PSSI). The club got promoted from Premier Division to Indonesian Super League.

Bojonegoro had played in Super League, but no wins in six games.

ISL Results summary

ISL Results by round

IPL
In late 2010, Bojonegoro withdrew from 2010-11 Indonesia Super League and move to 2011 Liga Primer Indonesia. Bojonegoro played their first game against Batavia Union on 9 January 2011, in a 0-2 loss at home.

Liga Primer Indonesia officials revealed Samsul Arif was a marquee signing, who sat outside the club's Liga Primer Indonesia salary cap.

Squad 

As of 30 April 2011, according to the IPL official website.

(captain)

Transfers

In

Out

References

Persibo Bojonegoro